The 2021–22 Atlantic Hockey men's ice hockey season was the 19th season of play for Atlantic Hockey and took place during the 2021–22 NCAA Division I men's ice hockey season. The regular season began on October 2, 2021 and conclude on February 26, 2022. The conference tournament began in March, 2022 and concluded with American International winning the conference championship.

Realignment
On May 26, 2021, Robert Morris University announced that it would be ending both its men and women's varsity hockey programs effective immediately. Fundraising efforts to save both program began immediately. While more than $1 million was secured in less than 3 months, by mid-August the school decided that the donations were insufficient to guarantee the program for the 2021–22 season and the team would look to return for the 2022–23 campaign.

Due to the dissolution of the WCHA, Alabama–Huntsville submitted a bid to join Atlantic Hockey. The 10 existing conference members mulled over admitting UAH, Long Island (an Independent who had been in a scheduling alliance with Atlantic Hockey in 2021), and an unnamed third team that had expressed interest in joining the conference. The member teams ultimately decided against expansion for the 2021–22 season by a unanimous vote.

Coaches
Bill Riga replaced David Berard as head coach for Holy Cross during the offseason.

Wayne Wilson enters the season needing 9 wins to reach 400 wins.

Records

Standings

Non-Conference record
Of the sixteen teams that are selected to participate in the NCAA tournament, ten will be via at-large bids. Those 10 teams are determined based upon the PairWise rankings. The rankings take into account all games played but are heavily affected by intra-conference results. The result is that teams from leagues which perform better in non-conference are much more likely to receive at-large bids even if they possess inferior records overall.

As a whole, Atlantic Hockey had a poor record against other conferences. While two programs ended with even marks in the regular season, no league member had a winning record in non-conference play. On aggregate, Atlantic Hockey posted losing records against every conference with the exception of ECAC Hockey.

Regular season record

Statistics

Leading scorers
GP = Games played; G = Goals; A = Assists; Pts = Points; PIM = Penalty minutes

Leading goaltenders
Minimum 1/3 of team's minutes played in conference games.

GP = Games played; Min = Minutes played; GA = Goals against; SO = Shutouts; SV% = Save percentage; GAA = Goals against average

Conference tournament

NCAA tournament

Midwest Regional semifinal

Ranking

USCHO

USCHO did not release a poll in week 24.

USA Today

Pairwise

Note: teams ranked in the top-10 automatically qualify for the NCAA tournament. Teams ranked 11-16 can qualify based upon conference tournament results.

Awards

Atlantic Hockey

Conference tournament

References

External links

2021–22
Atlantic
2021-22